Sainik School Nalanda is one of the 33 Sainik Schools of India.  It is a residential school for boys and girls .  The medium of instruction is English. It was established by Ministry of Defence (GOI) on 12 October 2003 at Nalanda. It is affiliated to the Central Board of Secondary Education and is a member of Indian Public Schools Conference (IPSC).

The school prepares boys for entry into the National Defence Academy, Khadakwasla, Pune and for other walks of life.

Administration

Campus 
Sainik School Nalanda is located at Nanand in Bihar.The campus is on the bank of Panchane river. The nearest town  Pawapuri is 2.5 km away.

Admissions

N.C.C.

Alumni
Over the period of last 13 years, Sainik School Nalanda has been sending students to National Defence Academy, Khadakvasla and then the cadets have graduated to become officers in the Indian Armed Forces.  Over 125 cadets have become officers and are serving on various fronts.

References

External links 
 
 Sainik Schools Society

Sainik schools
Schools in Bihar
Education in Nalanda district
Nalanda
Educational institutions established in 2003
2003 establishments in Bihar